alpha/beta-Hydrolase domain containing 6 (ABHD6), also known as monoacylglycerol lipase ABHD6 or 2-arachidonoylglycerol hydrolase is an enzyme that in humans is encoded by the ABHD6 gene.

Function  
ABHD6 is a serine hydrolyzing enzyme that possesses typical α/β-hydrolase family domains. ABHD6 was first studied because of its over-expression in certain forms of tumours.

ABHD6 has been linked to regulation of the endocannabinoid system as it controls the accumulation of 2-arachidonoylglycerol (2-AG) at the cannabinoid receptors.

ABHD6 accounts for about 4% of 2-AG brain hydrolysis. Together, monoacylglycerol lipase (MAGL), ABHD12, and ABHD6 control about 99% of 2-AG signalling in the brain, and each enzyme exhibits a distinct subcellular distribution, suggesting that they regulate distinct pools of 2-AG in the nervous system.

See also 
 Fatty acid amide hydrolase

References

External links